Bruno Henrique de Sousa (born 25 October 1992), known as just Bruno Henrique, is a Brazilian professional footballer who plays as a forward for Hoàng Anh Gia Lai.

Career
Henrique began his career Goiás but made his professional debut for Rio Branco in the Campeonato Paranaense in March 2014 in a 0–0 draw with Coritiba. He later spent time playing in Thailand, Portugal and Moldova before joining V.League 1 side Hong Linh Ha Tinh for the 2020 season.

References

External links
Brazilian and Portuguese football stats

1992 births
Living people
Brazilian footballers
Association football forwards
Brazilian expatriate footballers
Expatriate footballers in Thailand
Expatriate footballers in Portugal
Expatriate footballers in Moldova
Expatriate footballers in Vietnam
Brazilian expatriate sportspeople in Thailand
Brazilian expatriate sportspeople in Portugal
Brazilian expatriate sportspeople in Moldova
Brazilian expatriate sportspeople in Vietnam
Goiás Esporte Clube players
Associação Atlética Aparecidense players
Rio Branco Sport Club players
Sertãozinho Futebol Clube players
Valeriodoce Esporte Clube players
Uberaba Sport Club players
Leixões S.C. players
Esporte Clube Novo Hamburgo players
Associação Atlética de Altos players
S.C. Beira-Mar players
Moto Club de São Luís players
Campeonato Brasileiro Série D players
Campeonato Paranaense players
Liga Portugal 2 players
Moldovan Super Liga players
V.League 1 players
Hoang Anh Gia Lai FC players